Reginald Thomas Poole (15 January 1942 – 23 March 2021) was an Australian rules footballer who played for Hawthorn in the VFL during the 1960s.

Poole played in the back pocket for Hawthorn and was a premiership player in his debut season with the club. He retired young in 1968, at just 26 years of age.

His daughter, Katie Hudson, a businesswoman, is a member of the Hawthorn board of directors.

References

External links

1942 births
2021 deaths
Australian rules footballers from Victoria (Australia)
Hawthorn Football Club players
Hawthorn Football Club Premiership players
One-time VFL/AFL Premiership players